The Rwandan Patriotic Front (RPF–Inkotanyi, FPR) is the ruling political party in Rwanda. Led by President Paul Kagame, the party has governed the country since its armed wing defeated government forces, winning the Rwandan Civil War in 1994.

Since 1994, the party has ruled Rwanda using tactics which have been characterised as authoritarian. Elections are manipulated in various ways, which include banning opposition parties, arresting or assassinating critics, and electoral fraud.

History

Rwandese Alliance for National Unity
Following the overthrow of Idi Amin in 1979, the Tutsi refugee intelligentsia in Uganda set up the region's first political refugee organization, the Rwandese Alliance for National Unity (RANU), to discuss a possible return to Rwanda. Though primarily a forum for intellectual discussion, it became militant after Milton Obote's election of 1980 resulted in many Tutsi refugees joining Yoweri Museveni in fighting the Ugandan Bush War. In response, Obote denounced Museveni's National Resistance Army (NRA) as composed of Banyarwanda. A failed attempt to force all Tutsi refugees into the refugee camps in February 1982 resulted in a massive purge, driving 40,000 refugees back into Rwanda. Rwanda declared that they recognized only 4000 of these as Rwandan nationals, while Uganda declared that they would take back only 1000. The remaining 35,000 were left in a legal limbo along the border region that lasted for years, from where many refugee youths left to join the NRA.

Two of the militants who were part of the 1981 NRA raid at Kabamba that began the war were Tutsi refugees: Fred Rwigyema and Paul Kagame, who had grown up together in Kahunge refugee camp and were both active members of RANU. By the time that the victorious NRA entered Kampala in 1986, about a quarter of its 16,000 combatants were Banyarwanda, while Rwigyema was its deputy commander. After the Museveni government was formed, Rwigyema was appointed deputy minister of defense and deputy army commander-in-chief, second only to Museveni in the military chain of command for the nation. Kagame was appointed acting chief of military intelligence. Tutsi refugees formed a disproportionate number of NRA officers because they had joined the rebellion early and thus had accumulated more experience.

The contributions of the Banyarwanda in the war were immediately recognized by the new government. Six months after taking power, Museveni reversed the decades-old legal regime and declared that Banyarwanda who had resided in Uganda would be entitled to citizenship after 10 years. In December 1987, RANU held its seventh congress in Kampala and renamed itself the Rwanda Patriotic Front; The new RPF, dominated by Banyarwanda veterans of the war, was far more militaristic than the original RANU.

Rwandan Patriotic Front

Rwandan Civil War
On 1 October 1990, the RPF led by Major-General Fred Gisa Rwigyema invaded Rwanda, starting the Rwandan Civil War. The RPF incursion was initially successful, despite the death of Rwigyema from a bullet on 2 October. However, the Rwandan Army received help from Belgium, France and Zaire and within a month had regained the initiative, forcing the RPF back into Uganda.

Paul Kagame, who had been doing military studies in the United States, returned to take over the RPF. Thereafter the RPF resorted to guerrilla attacks, focusing on the Byumba and Ruhengeri areas, gaining control of much of the north of the country in 1992. Eventually negotiations between the RPF and the Rwandan government led to the signing of the Arusha Accords in 1993, resulting in RPF personnel and other refugees being allowed to return to the country. In 1993 the RPF lost local elections in the northern part of Rwanda which it controlled militarily, leading its leaders to conclude that it would not win free and fair elections in the future.

The cease-fire ended on 6 April 1994 when President Juvénal Habyarimana's plane was shot down near Kigali Airport, killing him and Cyprien Ntaryamira, the President of Burundi. It is still unknown who launched the attack; the RPF blamed Hutu extremists in the Rwandan government, while the government claimed that the RPF was responsible for the attack. The shooting down of the plane served as the catalyst for the Rwandan genocide, which began within a few hours. Over the course of approximately 100 days, an estimated 500,000 to 600,000 Tutsi were killed, on the orders of the interim government. The Tutsi RPF restarted their offensive, and took control of the country methodically by cutting off government supply routes and taking advantage of the deteriorating social order. On 7 June, the Hutu Archbishop of Kigali, Vincent Nsengiyumva, was murdered near the Kabgayi church center with two bishops and thirteen priests by members of the RPF, who were said to have believed the prelates were involved with the killing of their families.

Some Western observers alleged that the RPF prioritized taking power over saving lives or stopping the genocide. In Shake Hands with the Devil, Romeo Dallaire writes, "The deaths of Rwandans can also be laid at the door of the military genius, Paul Kagame, who did not speed up his [military] campaign when the scale of the genocide became clear, and even talked candidly with me at several points about the price his fellow Tutsi might have to pay for the cause." According to Gerald Caplan, citing this quote from Dallaire, continued, "The 'cause' was clear. It was not defeating the Government’s forces to stop the genocide as soon as possible. It was continuing the civil war until the RPF could take over the entire country." Luc Marchal, the senior Belgian peacekeeper in Rwanda at the time, told Judi Rever, "Not only did the RPF not show the slightest interest in protecting Tutsis, it fuelled the chaos. The RPF had one objective. It was to seize power and use the massacres as stock in trade to justify its military operations. This is what I saw."

The RPF victory was complete when Kigali was captured on 4 July and the rest of the country on 18 July. The RPF was split into a political division which retained the RPF name, and a military one, called the Rwandan Patriotic Army (now the Rwandan Defence Forces).

Postwar governance in Rwanda
After the RPF took control of the country, in 1994, it formed a government of national unity headed by a Hutu president, Pasteur Bizimungu. Kagame became Minister of Defense and Vice-President. According to Reuters, "Cooperation between Bizimungu, a Hutu, and Kagame, a Tutsi, was intended to symbolize post-genocide reconciliation." This collaboration did not survive, however. Bizimungu left the government in 2000, and after forming his own political party, he was arrested in 2002. Sentenced to 15 years in prison, he was released with a pardon from Kagame in 2007. Despite political gestures from the RPF toward Rwanda's Hutu majority, there remained substantial distrust of Hutus toward the Tutsi-dominated RPF, based on a number of factors: killings of Hutus by the RPF both in Rwanda and later in Congo, plus mass arrests of suspected genocide perpetrators.

In February 1998 Kagame was elected president of the RPF, replacing Alexis Kanyarengwe, and in March 2000 he became the national president. Following a constitutional referendum in 2003, Kagame was elected president with 95% of the vote. The RPF formed a coalition with several smaller parties, which received 74% of the vote in the 2003 parliamentary elections, winning 40 of the 53 elected seats in the Chamber of Deputies. The coalition won 42 seats in the 2008 parliamentary elections, and Kagame was re-elected as president in 2010 with 93% of the vote. The 2013 parliamentary elections saw the RPF-led coalition win 41 seats.

According to political scientist Lars Waldorf, the RPF "sees majoritarian democracy with free elections not just as a recipe for political defeat but also for murderous violence".

Electoral history

Presidential elections

Chamber of Deputies elections

References

Further reading

External links
Official website

 
1987 establishments in Rwanda
Guerrilla organizations
Political parties established in 1987
Political parties in Rwanda
Rebel groups in Rwanda
Rwanda–Uganda relations
Rwandan genocide
Tutsi